Robert Stockton Green (March 25, 1831 – May 7, 1895) was an American Democratic Party politician, who was the 27th governor of New Jersey from 1887 to 1890. He also sat for one term in the United States House of Representatives from 1885 to 1887.

Early life and education
Green was born in Princeton, New Jersey, the son of James S. Green and the former Isabella Williamson McCulloh. His father was U.S. Attorney for the District of New Jersey from 1835 to 1850. He graduated from the College of New Jersey (now Princeton University) in 1850. He studied law, was admitted to the bar in 1853 and commenced practice in Elizabeth, New Jersey.

On October 1, 1857, he married the former Mary E. Mulligan. They had four children: Caroline, Catherine, Isabelle and Robert Stockton Green, Jr.

Political career
He was a member of the Elizabeth city council from 1863 to 1873, and was presiding judge of the Union County Court of Common Pleas from 1868 to 1873.

Congress and governor
He was a US representative in the Forty-ninth United States Congress from March 4, 1885, until his resignation on January 17, 1887, when he stepped down to become Governor of New Jersey from 1887 to 1889.

Judge
Green was a delegate to the Democratic National Conventions in 1860, 1880 and 1888.

He was a judge on the New Jersey Court of Errors and Appeals, then the state's highest court, in 1894 and 1895.

Death
He died in Elizabeth on May 7, 1895. He was buried in Green-Wood Cemetery in Brooklyn, New York City.

References

External links

Biography of Robert Stockton Green (PDF), New Jersey State Library
New Jersey Governor Robert Stockton Green, National Governors Association
Robert Stockton Green at The Political Graveyard

1831 births
1890 deaths
Burials at Green-Wood Cemetery
Democratic Party governors of New Jersey
New Jersey lawyers
New Jersey state court judges
People from Princeton, New Jersey
Democratic Party members of the United States House of Representatives from New Jersey
Princeton University alumni
American Presbyterians
19th-century American politicians
19th-century American judges
19th-century American lawyers